Sabine Lisicki was the defending champion but chose not to compete due to a left ankle injury.

Samantha Stosur won the title, defeating Vera Zvonareva in the final 6–0, 6–3.

Seeds
The top eight seeds receive a bye into the second round.

Draw

Finals

Top half

Section 1

Section 2

Bottom half

Section 3

Section 4

References
Main Draw
Qualifying Singles

Family Circle Cup - Singles
Charleston Open